A Jagged Era is the debut studio album by American R&B group Jagged Edge, released on October 21, 1997 by So So Def and Columbia Records. The quartet worked with So So Def head Jermaine Dupri on the majority of the album. A Jagged Era peaked at a number 104 on the US Billboard 200 and at number 19 on the Top R&B/Hip-Hop Albums. Despite its disappointing peak, the album was moderately successful with sales of over 500,000 copies in the United States, earning a Gold certification by the Recording Industry Association of America (RIAA). In 2009, the album was the best-selling album in cassette format.

Three singles from the album were released. Lead single "The Way That You Talk"  peaked at a number 34 on the Billboard Hot R&B/Hip-Hop Singles & Tracks chart, while becoming their first single to chart on the Billboard Hot 100. Follow-up "I Gotta Be" performed better on the charts, peaking at number 11 on the Hot R&B/Hip-Hop Singles & Tracks chart and number 23 on the Billboard Hot 100, becoming the first Top 40 single. "I Gotta Be" had two videos shot for the song, one in 1997 and one in 1998 which featured Jagged Edge with members of Destiny's Child, with Kelly Rowland in the first shot, LeToya Luckett in the second shot, LaTavia Roberson in third and Beyoncé Knowles in the final shot before Jagged Edge takes over the rest of the video.

Track listing

Samples
"Ain't No Stoppin'" contains a portion of "Don't Stop the Music" (1980) performed by Yarbrough and Peoples.

Charts

Weekly charts

Year-end charts

Certifications

References

External links

Jagged Edge (American group) albums
1997 debut albums
Albums produced by Jermaine Dupri